King of the World may refer to:

Books
King of the World (biography), 1998 biography of Muhammad Ali written by David Remnick
King of the World, a 1989 novel by Merrill Joan Gerber
The King of the World, a 1927 book by René Guénon

Film and television
King of the World (film), a 2000 television film about Mohammed Ali
King of the World: The King Kong Show, a 1966 television special of The King Kong Show

Music

Albums
King of the World (album), a 1980 album by Sheila and B. Devotion, and its title track
King of the World, a 1970 album by Cuby + Blizzards
King of the World, a 2007 album by Ward 21

Songs
"King of the World" (Natalie Grant song), 2016
"King of the World" (Point of Grace song), 2008
"King of the World" (Weezer song), 2016
"King of the World", a 1973 song by Steely Dan from Countdown to Ecstasy
"King of the World", a 1994 song by Angelfish from Angelfish
"King of the World", a 1995 song by Jason Robert Brown from the musical Songs for a New World
"King of the World", a 1995 song by Blackhawk from Strong Enough
"King of the World", a 1998 song by Jeff Black from Birmingham Road
"King of the World", a 1999 song by The Smithereens from God Save The Smithereens
"King of the World", a 2001 song by Bob Schneider from Lonelyland
"King of the World", a 2006 song by Toto from Falling in Between
"King of the World", a 2009 song by Livan
"King of the World", a 2009 song by Porcelain Black
"King of the World", a 2012 song by Show of Hands from Wake the Union
"King of the World", a 2015 song by Blue from Colours
"King of the World", a 2015 song by Natalie Grant from Be One

Other
King of the Universe, and ancient Mesopotamian title
 I'm the king of the world! - a line from the 1997 film Titanic

See also
World domination